WWF Fully Loaded was an annual July pay-per-view (PPV) event produced by the World Wrestling Federation (WWF, now WWE), a Connecticut-based professional wrestling promotion. First held in 1998, the first edition of Fully Loaded was an In Your House pay-per-view. The 1999 edition was simply named Fully Loaded as WWF dropped the In Your House branding after February 1999. Fully Loaded was held for one more year in 2000. In 2001, the event's pay-per-view slot was replaced by the one-off Invasion, which was replaced by Vengeance in 2002.

History
Fully Loaded was first held as an In Your House pay-per-view (PPV) event. In Your House was a series of monthly PPVs first produced by the World Wrestling Federation (WWF, now WWE) in May 1995. They aired when the promotion was not holding one of its major PPVs and were sold at a lower cost. Fully Loaded: In Your House was the 23rd In Your House event and took place on July 26, 1998, at the Selland Arena in Fresno, California.

After the In Your House branding was retired following February 1999's St. Valentine's Day Massacre: In Your House, Fully Loaded branched off as its own PPV that July. A final event was held in July 2000. In 2001, it was replaced by InVasion, which was held as part of The Invasion storyline between the WWF and The Alliance (consisting of former World Championship Wrestling and Extreme Championship Wrestling talent). However, Invasion was used only once and the July slot was then given to Vengeance in 2002, thus Fully Loaded was definitively discontinued.

Events

References

External links
Fully Loaded: In Your House Results at Online World of Wrestling
Fully Loaded 1999 Results at Online World of Wrestling
Fully Loaded 2000 Results at Online World of Wrestling
Fully Loaded Results at Wrestling Supercards and Tournaments